Glyphocyphidae is an extinct family of sea urchins in the class Echinoidea.

These slow-moving low-level epifaunal grazers lived from the Cretaceous to the Paleogene periods (136.4 to 48.6 Ma).

Genera
Ambipleurus Lambert, 1932
Arachniopleurus Duncan & Sladen, 1882
Dictyopleurus Duncan & Sladen, 1882
Echinopsis
Glyphocyphus
Hemidiadema
Rachiosoma
Rhabdopleurus Cotteau, 1893

References

 
Valanginian first appearances
Paleogene extinctions